Albert M. Stall, Jr. (born October 10, 1961 in New Orleans, Louisiana) is an American Thoroughbred horse racing trainer best known for winning the 2010 Breeders' Cup Classic in which his horse Blame defeated the great filly, Zenyatta.

Early life
Al Stall Jr. is one of four children of Al Stall Sr. (died 2017), who was the chairman of the Louisiana Racing Commission for 18 years, and Susan Ellender Stall.

He first gained experience training racehorses by working with Frank Brothers during high school holidays before attending Louisiana State University where he graduated with a Bachelor of Science in Geology. He worked in the oil industry before becoming a trainer, starting as an assistant to Brothers for five years.

Trainer
When Frank Brothers retired in late 2007, Stall became the primary trainer for the legendary Claiborne Farm in 2007 until 2016.

Stall won the 1,000th race of his career on May 23, 2010, at Arlington Park with Toll in the second race. His North American career earnings exceed $65 million with 1,710 wins through August 6, 2021.

His best year by earnings was when he finished 10th among all trainers in 2010, and his best year in wins was 2011 at 55th.

His top-earning horse was Blame with $4.36 million in earnings followed by Departing at $1.86 million, Tom's d'Etat at $1.76 million and Star Guitar at $1.74 million.

Stall has 37 grades stakes wins.

Family
Stall and his wife Nicole have two children, Albert II and Greta.

References

1961 births
Living people
American horse trainers
Sportspeople from New Orleans